Tzveleviochloa is a genus of flowering plants belonging to the family Poaceae.

Its native range is the Himalayas, India and Myanmar to south central China.

The genus name of Tzveleviochloa is in honour of Nikolai Tzvelev (1925–2015), a Russian botanist and specialist in grasses and ferns.
 
It was first described and published by Martin Röser and Alexandra Wölkin in Taxon vol.66 on page 38 in 2017.

Known species
According to Kew:
 Tzveleviochloa burmanica (Bor) Röser & A.Wölk 
 Tzveleviochloa parviflora (Hook.f.) Röser & A.Wölk 
 Tzveleviochloa potaninii (Tzvelev) Röser & A.Wölk 
 Tzveleviochloa schmidii

References

Poaceae
Poaceae genera
Flora of South-Central China
Flora of India (region)
Flora of East Himalaya
Flora of West Himalaya
Flora of Myanmar